Transport Aérien Transrégional was a French regional airline with its head office on the grounds of Tours Val de Loire Airport in Tours. It was formed in 1968 as Touraine Air Transport (TAT) by M. Marchais. Air France acquired a minority stake in the airline in 1989. Between 1993 and 1996 the company was gradually taken over by British Airways. It subsequently merged with Air Liberté.

The merged entity was sold on to the SAir Group in 2001, which in turn merged Air Liberté  with AOM becoming the renamed "Air Lib" {Wikipedia French article} continuing the heritage of TAT until the merged airline failed in 2003.

History

Touraine Air Transport commenced scheduled operations in 1968. The airline acquired its first Beech 99 Airliner twin-engined turboprop passenger airliner in June 1971 and used this type to commence French internal services. These aircraft remained in operation with TAT until 1975.

During the 1970s TAT began building up a comprehensive network of regional, short-haul domestic and international scheduled routes, as a result of being taken over in 1973 by Société Auxiliare de Services et Materiel Aéronautiques (SASMAT), the owner of rival French regional airline Rousseau Aviation, as well as the subsequent mergers with regional rivals Taxi Avia France and Air Paris. The resulting regional network served 30 provincial points in France and neighbouring European countries from Paris Orly, Lyons Satolas, Lille and St. Brieuc, respectively.

Many of TAT's French domestic routes were operated in collaboration with Air Inter, at the time the dominant domestic scheduled airline in France as well as the largest domestic airline in Europe. Most international routes were operated in conjunction with Air France, the primary French flag carrier at the time. Year-round services linking Lille with London Heathrow as well as Strasbourg with Milan Linate and a seasonal Béziers-London Gatwick service were among the international routes TAT operated during that time.

All joint operations with Air Inter and Air France were operated under those airlines' flight numbers and were prefixed with those carriers' two-letter airline identification codes as allocated by IATA, i.e. IT for Air Inter and AF for Air France. The aircraft used on all year-round international operations under contract to Air France wore that airline's full aircraft livery.

From the late 1970s until the early 1980s, TAT used to operate a scheduled German internal route linking Saarbrücken with Berlin Tegel. This route was operated on behalf of TAT Export, a wholly owned subsidiary.

The airline also started an express delivery services company in 1976 which still exists as of 2007.

During the early 1980s TAT acquired regional rivals Air Alpes, Air Alsace and Union Aéronautique Regionale. As a result of these mergers, the airline established itself as France's largest regional airline as well as the leading regional partner of Air France. It also resulted in an expanded network covering more than 50 points throughout France and Europe. TAT changed its official name to Transport Aérien Transrégional in 1984 to reflect the growth in its scheduled route network.

In July 1989 Air France acquired a 35% stake in TAT. (At that time TAT was the fourth-largest French airline [after Air France, Air Inter and UTA].)

In the early 1990s TAT began taking advantage of the EU's newly liberalised internal air transport market by launching a three times daily scheduled service between Paris-Charles de Gaulle and London Gatwick, the first time it had operated a scheduled service on a major international European trunk route. This was also the time TAT began marketing itself as TAT European Airlines.

In January 1993 British Airways acquired a 49.9% stake in TAT.  From then on TAT began operating all international scheduled services in British Airways colours and under BA flight numbers. TAT also joined the British Airways Executive Club frequent flier programme at that time. The change in ownership furthermore resulted in the launch of two new international routes linking Lyon and Marseille with London Gatwick from the start of the 1993 summer timetable period. TAT's subsequent launch of three daily return flights between Paris Orly and London Heathrow complemented British Airways' own thrice daily Heathrow-Orly service. This enabled British Airways to circumvent the slot restrictions the slot co-ordinator for the airports in the Paris region had imposed on Orly's non-resident airline users, which limited each of these airlines to holding a maximum of four daily pairs of slots, and to offer up to six daily round-trips on that route. As a result of these developments, Air France ended all commercial co-operation with TAT.

In August 1996 British Airways acquired the remaining 50.1% of TAT's share capital, thus acquiring 100% ownership.

In 1997 British Airways brought TAT under joint management control with Air Liberté, in which it had acquired a controlling stake in October 1996.

British Airways subsequently merged TAT into Air Liberté to achieve a significant reduction in costs and greater operational synergies. The UK flag carrier eventually disposed of the merged entity in May 2001 to rid itself of years of heavy losses and difficult labour relations at its French subsidiaries.

Fleet

Throughout its existence TAT operated a variety of piston-engined commuter airliners as well as regional turboprop and jet aircraft, including the following main types:

 Aérospatiale Corvette
 Beech King Air C90
 Beech 99/99A
 Boeing 737-200
 Fairchild F-27A
 Fairchild-Hiller FH-227B
 Fokker F.27 Friendship
 Fokker F.28 Fellowship (1000/2000/4000 series)
 Fokker 100
 McDonnell Douglas DC-9 (10/20 series)
 Nord 262
 VFW 614

Incidents and accidents
During its existence TAT suffered two fatal accidents and four non-fatal incidents. These occurred between 1975 and 1991.

Fatal accidents
The first fatal accident occurred on 2 July 1975. One of the airline's Beech 99 commuter airliners (registration F-BTQE) operating a scheduled domestic flight from Nantes to Brest crashed on take-off from Nantes Airport due to the failure of the aircraft's no. 2 engine, as a result of which it caught fire. The aircraft came down on a nearby railway line. All eight occupants, including both pilots and six passengers were killed in this accident.

The second fatal accident occurred on 4 March 1988. It involved one of the company's Fairchild-Hiller FH227Bs (registration F-GCPS) operating an early morning scheduled service from Nancy to Paris Orly as TAT Flight 230. An electrical system malfunction during the start of the aircraft's descent on the final portion of its flight to Paris Orly resulted in a sudden loss of control. This in turn caused the aircraft to descend very rapidly. It struck power lines and crashed near Fontainebleau, killing all 23 occupants (two pilots, one flight attendant and 20 passengers). This accident constituted the firm's worst air disaster in terms of loss of life.

Non-fatal incidents
On 5 July 1979 a Fairchild F-27A (registration F-GBRS) with 18 occupants on board was damaged beyond repair in an incident that occurred on the ground at Paris Orly while the aircraft was stationary. None of the aircraft's occupants were injured as a result of that incident. The aircraft was subsequently written off.

On 4 September 1983 a Beech 99 (registration F-BUYG) was damaged beyond repair following a crash at Tours. There were no reported injuries among the aircraft's occupants.

Code data
Former IATA code (1): VD (TAT)
Former IATA code (2):  IJ (Touraine Air Transport)  
Former IATA code (3): IO (TAT Export)
Former ICAO code: TAT
Former callsign:

Notes
Photograph of timetable 
Photograph of a TAT F28-1000 in Air France colours at Edinburgh Turnhouse in the late 1970s 

British Airways Archives and Museum Collection (1990–present) 
 (various backdated issues relating to TAT, 1968–2001)

Bibliography
 Eastwood, Tony, and Roach, John. Turbo Prop Airliner Production List. 1998. The Aviation Hobby Shop. .

References

External links 

 Official site of TAT Group
 Official site of TAT Group 

Defunct airlines of France
Airlines established in 1968
Airlines disestablished in 1997
French companies established in 1968
French companies disestablished in 1997